Typhoon Roy, known in the Philippines as Typhoon Asiang, was the second-most intense January tropical cyclone on record in the Western Pacific basin. Forming out of an area of disturbed weather on January 7, 1988, Roy quickly intensified as it moved through the Marshall Islands. By January 9, the storm intensified into a typhoon and attained its peak intensity the following day. At its peak, sustained winds reached . Slight weakening took place before the storm moved through the Mariana Islands. Continuing westward, the system eventually struck the Philippines as a minimal typhoon before dissipating over the South China Sea on January 19.

Throughout its track, Typhoon Roy was responsible for two fatalities and $28.5 million (1988 USD) in losses, mainly in the Mariana Islands. Light to moderate structural damage took place across the Marshall Islands as the system moved through the region as a tropical storm. On January 12, the typhoon caused widespread damage to Guam and Rota as it brushed the two islands, destroying at least 200 homes.

Meteorological history

Typhoon Roy originated from an area of disturbed weather in early January 1988 in the central Pacific. Above average sea surface temperatures in the area allowed for gradual development as convection increased. By January 6, the JTWC began monitoring the disturbance for the possibility of it developing into a tropical cyclone; a mirror system was present in the Southern Hemisphere at the same time. The system south of the equator eventually developed into Tropical Cyclone Anne. By January 7, the Japan Meteorological Agency (JMA) classified the system as a tropical depression; shortly thereafter, the JTWC issued a Tropical Cyclone Formation Alert for the depression. Early on January 8, the JTWC issued their first advisory on Tropical Depression 08W, at which time the system was located near the Marshall Islands.

Tracking nearly due west, the depression was upgraded to Tropical Storm Roy six hours after the first advisory based on satellite data. By this time, the JMA had already classified Roy as a tropical storm. Continued deepening took place as the storm moved through the Marshall Islands; weather radar data from Kwajalein Atoll indicated the formation of an eye several hours after Roy was named; this was later supported by satellite information on January 9, at which time the storm was upgraded to a typhoon.

At the same time, the JMA estimated that the storm attained peak winds of  along with a barometric pressure of 940 mbar (hPa). Over the following few days, Roy gradually slowed and weakened as it neared the Mariana Islands. As the storm passed through the region, a new ridge built east of the typhoon, causing Roy to temporarily track southwestward before resuming a westward movement.

Moving along the southern edge of the ridge, Roy accelerated again as it headed towards the Philippines. On January 14, the storm crossed 135°E, prompting the Philippine Atmospheric, Geophysical and Astronomical Services Administration to issue advisories on Roy, assigning it with the local name Asiang. As it neared the country, wind shear began to increase, resulting in further weakening. On January 16, Roy made landfall in the Bicol Region as a minimal typhoon before succumbing to shear and increased friction with the mountains of the Philippines. Later that day, the system weakened to a tropical storm before entering the South China Sea. The JTWC downgraded Roy to a tropical depression during the afternoon of January 17 and ceased issuing advisories early the next day.

Preparations and impact
On January 8, Roy passed near the Majuro island chain in the Marshall Islands as a minimal tropical storm. Later that day, the intensifying storm passed close to Kwajalein Atoll, bringing strong winds and large swells. Approximately one third of the homes on Ebeye were destroyed by the storm. One person was killed and damage was estimated at $5 million (1988 USD). An estimated 3,500 people were left homeless as a result of Roy in the Marshall Islands.

Ahead of Roy's arrival in the Mariana Islands and Guam, the public was given sufficient warning by the local disaster preparedness team. An estimated 1,200 people evacuated to shelters across Guam and all flights to and from the island were canceled for January 12.

On January 12, Typhoon Roy passed through the Mariana Islands and Guam, causing moderate structural damage and extensive crop losses. On Guam alone, agricultural losses reached $23.5 million (1988 USD; $  USD). Most structural damage was limited to broken windows on the island. Located within  of Roy's eye during its passage of the Mariana Islands, Rota received the worst damage from the cyclone. At least 200 of the 450 of homes on Rota were destroyed and the remainder were damaged; 95% of the power poles fell across the island, resulting in severe disruption to daily life. Roughly 80% of the concrete homes had their windows blown out. Four people were injured after the roof of one building was blown into another where people had sought shelter. One person died after suffering a heart attack induced by the storm. In the wake of the storm, the Federal Emergency Management Agency declared a state of emergency for Guam.

The last area affected by Typhoon Roy was the Philippines, which was struck by the storm on January 16. Prior to the storm's arrival, typhoon warnings were raised for 29 provinces in the country, including the capital city of Manila. In the Bicol Region, winds likely reached typhoon intensity; however, no known damage took place in the area. Continuing westward, the Roy brought gale-force winds to parts of southern Luzon before moving into the South China Sea. Low-lying areas in the storm's path were flooded by heavy rains and strong winds downed power lines in Sorsogon.

Records and retirement
Since the JMA kept reliable records in 1951, Roy became the ninth known typhoon to develop during the month of January as well as the second most intense during the month, attaining a minimum pressure of 940 mbar (hPa). In addition to intensity records, Typhoon Roy also was an unusually long-lived storm, spanning 12 days from formation to dissipation. This ranks it as the second-longest lived storm during January, just 12 hours short of Typhoon Alice in 1979.

Due to the severity of damage wrought by Typhoon Roy, the name was retired following its usage and replaced with Ryan. Since little damage took place in the Philippines, the name Asiang was not retired and was later used for another cyclone.

See also

Other storms named Roy
Other storms named Asiang
Tropical Storm Mekkhala (2015)
Typhoon Hagupit (2014)

Notes

References

External links
The Joint Typhoon Warning Center's Report on Typhoon Roy 

Retired Pacific typhoons
Typhoons
Typhoons in Guam
1988 Pacific typhoon season
1988 disasters in the Philippines
Typhoons in the Philippines
Tropical cyclones in 1988